UNL may refer to:
Union Nationale Lycéenne, a French secondary student union 
Universal Networking Language, a knowledge representation language used in natural language processing
University of Nebraska–Lincoln, a university in Lincoln, Nebraska, U.S.
University of North London, a former university in the United Kingdom
UEFA Nations League, an international association football competition involving the men's national teams of UEFA's member associations
Universidad Nacional del Litoral, a university in Santa Fe, Argentina
Universidade NOVA de Lisboa (NOVA University of Lisbon), a university in Lisbon, Portugal
Touhou Hisōtensoku, a Touhou Project video game better known as Unthinkable Natural Law in the English localizations
Usher's New Look, a youth leadership development organization